Michael David Cummings (born August 25, 1968), better known as Spider One, is an American singer, record producer, and director. He is the founder and only consistent member of the rock band Powerman 5000. He is the younger sibling of singer and filmmaker Rob Zombie.

Early life 
Spider One was born Michael David Cummings in Haverhill, Massachusetts, the second of two sons. His older brother, Robert Bartleh Cummings, is better known as the musician and film director Rob Zombie. Contrary to popular belief, Spider One stated that there has never been a sibling rivalry between him and his brother, neither personally nor musically. In 1991, he dropped out of art school, bought a cheap four-track home studio and a drum machine, and recorded Much Evil with producer Lamar Lowder. Building on local success, Spider One's band Powerman 5000 was born.

Career 

Cummings created the horror/black comedy mockumentary series Death Valley, which aired on MTV for one season in 2011. He is the owner of Megatronic Records.

Style 
Spider One's influences reportedly include Kurt Cobain, Philip Anselmo, Chris Cornell, Sebastian Bach, Tom Araya, Dave Mustaine, Anthony Kiedis, Jonathan Davis, Jon Bon Jovi, Eddie Vedder, Vince Neil, James Hetfield, Joey Tempest and Axl Rose. Spider One's vocal style is usually based in spoken word or chanting.

Discography 

True Force (1994)
The Blood-Splat Rating System (1995)
Mega!! Kung Fu Radio (1997)
Tonight the Stars Revolt! (1999)
Anyone for Doomsday? (2001)
Transform (2003)
Destroy What You Enjoy (2006)
Somewhere on the Other Side of Nowhere (2009)
Copies, Clones & Replicants (2011)
Builders of the Future (2014)
New Wave (2017)
The Noble Rot (2020)

Filmography

References

External links 

1968 births
American heavy metal singers
American industrial musicians
American male singers
American music video directors
Musicians from Boston
Living people
Musicians from Haverhill, Massachusetts
Nu metal singers
Powerman 5000 members